Gerardo Roxas y Arroyo (fl. estimated between 1839 and 1887 – April 21, 1891 on Panay, Philippines) was the father of Manuel Roxas, the fifth President of the Philippines. Roxas was also the great-grandfather of former senator and Secretary of the Interior and Local Government, Mar Roxas.

Roxas served as a military soldier and servant in the Spanish Colonial Era in the Philippines.

Early life
Roxas was born to Antonio Roxas (II) and Lucina Arroyo in Capiz, Panay Island. He was a grandson of Caetano Roxas and the great-grandson of Juan Roxas y Arroyo (the son of Antonio Roxas y Ureta).

Personal life and death
Roxas was married to Rosario Acuña y Villaruz. The couple had four children - Mamerto, Manuel, Leopoldo and Margarita. Manuel was a posthumous child, as Roxas had died after having been mortally wounded by Spanish Guardia Civil before Manuel was born.

Lineage
Roxas was a descendant of Antonio Roxas y Ureta, the brother of Domingo Roxas y Ureta  (who was a progenitor of the Roxas de Ayala and Zobel de Ayala clans).

 Antonio Roxas y Ureta - second great-grandfather
 Juan Roxas y Arroyo - great-grandfather
 Caetano Roxas - grandfather
 Antonio Roxas (II) - father
 Lucina Arroyo-Roxas - mother 
Gerardo Roxas y Arroyo
Manuel Roxas (1892 – 1948) - son; Philippine president
Gerardo Manuel Roxas ("Gerry") (1924 – 1982) - grandson; Philippine senator
Manuel Roxas II ("Mar") (b. 1957) - great-grandson; Philippine senator, former DILG secretary
Gerardo Roxas, Jr. ("Dinggoy") (1960 – 1993) - great-grandson;  Philippine congressman

References

Roxas family
Year of birth uncertain
1891 deaths
Filipino people of Spanish descent
Visayan people
People from Capiz